Zachary C. Dixon (born March 5, 1956) is a former professional American football running back in the National Football League (NFL) for the Denver Broncos, New York Giants, Philadelphia Eagles, Baltimore Colts and Seattle Seahawks.

Biography
Born in Boston, Dixon played college football at Dean College in Franklin, Massachusetts, and at Temple University in Philadelphia.

He was originally drafted by the Denver Broncos in the 11th round of the 1979 NFL Draft.  In six seasons he had 197 rushing attempts for 732 yards and 3 touchdowns as well as 41 receptions for 367 yards and 1 touchdown.  Used primarily on special teams, he had 128 kickoff returns for 2,634 yards and 1 touchdown.  In 1983, while playing for the Baltimore Colts and Seattle Seahawks, he led the NFL in kick returns (51) and kick return yards (1,171).

In the late 1980s, he briefly worked in the Maryland area for Circuit City Stores, Inc as a sales counselor.

He is the father of former Seahawks defensive end Raheem Brock. He is the brother of retired professional women's basketball player Medina Dixon.

Notes and references

American football running backs
Living people
1956 births
Denver Broncos players
Dean College alumni
Temple Owls football players
New York Giants players
Philadelphia Eagles players